Government Center is a district in the western portion of downtown Miami, Florida bound roughly by I-95 and West (NW/SW) 3rd Avenue to the west, South (SW/SE) 1st Street to the south, North (NE/NW) 5th Street to the north, and East (NE/SE) 1st Avenue to the east.

The area includes several courthouses, including the historic Miami-Dade County Courthouse and a US district court, the City of Miami police headquarters, city, county, and state offices. The eponymous and most used county transit station, Government Center, serving Metrorail, Metromover, and Metrobus, is located in the bottom of the Stephen P. Clark Government Center building. Directly south of this is the main branch of the Miami-Dade Public Library System, as well as the HistoryMiami museum. Henry Flagler's Florida East Coast Railroad owns roughly nine acres in the middle of Government Center, the site of its former Miami station, which spans several blocks. While the station was destroyed in 1963 and the site had been used as surface parking lots in the decades following, the railroad never gave up ownership of the property. In mid 2014, the lots were closed down for construction of the MiamiCentral intercity rail station, as part of the Brightline system.

Besides governmental office and public buildings, there are many street level retail shops and some private office space in Government Center. The New World School of the Arts is located on the east side of Government Center, adjacent to Miami-Dade College's Wolfson Campus. Additionally, there is much historic architecture dating as far back as the late 19th century in Government Center, which overlaps largely with the Downtown Miami Historic District.

Notable locations

Stephen P. Clark Government Center
Government Center (MDT station)
MiamiCentral railroad station
Courthouse Center (Miami)
Courthouse Tower
Miami-Dade County Courthouse
Wilkie D. Ferguson Jr US Courthouse
David W. Dyer Federal Building and United States Courthouse
Old United States Post Office and Courthouse (Miami, Florida)
Miami-Dade Public Library System
HistoryMiami
Museum Tower (Miami)
Law Enforcement Officers' Memorial High School
City of Miami Police headquarters building
Rhode state office building
Claude Pepper Federal Building
New World School of the Arts

Gallery

References

Neighborhoods in Miami